The 1967–68 Anaheim Amigos season was the first and only season of the franchise in the American Basketball Association (ABA). On February 2, 1967, a charter franchise in Anaheim, California was awarded to Art Kim and James Ackerman for $30,000. They participated in the first ever ABA game, losing 134–129 to the Oakland Oaks. The team ended up losing their first five games of the season, winning their first game 13 days later. The team only played 12 games at home in the calendar year of 1967, while playing on the road (or at a neutral site) for the other 25. The team failed to garner much interest from the locale, along with having to deal with working around the Convention Center's busy schedule due to being across the street from Disneyland. Three of the home games for the Amigos were played in Honolulu, Hawaii. The team lost $500,000 over the course of the season. They led the league in turnovers with 1,516, averaging over 19 a game, with the highest being 36 against the Denver Rockets.

After the Amigos lost on December 27, Harry Dinnel took over as coach before they played the next day on the 28th. The team never won more than three games in a row, with their highest winning streak being 2 games, which they did 7 times. From January 7 to January 21, they lost 8 straight games. After the season, the team moved to Los Angeles to become the Los Angeles Stars. Jim Hardy, the newly hired general manager for the Stars stated that "This is a brand-new franchise. We will have new players, new uniforms, new management, as well as a new home. The Amigos have been buried, and we burned their uniforms after the final game."

Roster

Regular season

Western Division

Record vs. opponents

Game log

Footnotes
 The game was held at Mid-South Coliseum in Memphis, Tennessee.

Awards and honors
1968 ABA All-Star Game selections (game played on January 9, 1968)
 Ben Warley
 Larry Bunce

References

External links
 RememberTheABA.com 1967–68 regular season and playoff results
 RememberTheABA.com Anaheim Amigos page

Anaheim Amigos
Anaheim Amigos, 1967-68
Anaheim Amigos, 1967-68
Basketball in Anaheim, California